Anaxilas or Anaxilaus, son of Cretines, was a tyrant of Rhegium (modern Reggio Calabria).  He was originally from Messenia, a region in the Peloponnese.

Life
Anaxilas was master of Rhegium in 494 BC, when he encouraged the Samians and other Ionian fugitives to seize Zancle, a city across the strait in Sicily which was then under the rule of the tyrant Scythes.  Shortly after the Samian takeover, Anaxilas besieged the city himself, drove the Samians out, peopled it with fresh inhabitants, and changed its name to Messana, after his native Messene.

Pausanias tells a somewhat different story.  After the second war with the Spartans, Anaxilas assisted the refugees from Messina in the Peloponnese to take Zancle in Sicily.

Anaxilas married Cydippe, daughter of Terillus, tyrant of Himera.  In 480 BC he obtained the assistance of the Carthaginians for his father-in-law, who had been expelled from his city by Theron, tyrant of Agrigentum.  It was this auxiliary army that Gelo defeated at Himera.  Anaxilas wanted to destroy the Locrians, but was prevented by Hiero I of Syracuse, as related by Epicharmus.

Anaxilas' daughter was married to Hiero.  Anaxilaus died in 476 BC, leaving Micythus guardian of his children. The children only gained control of their inheritance in 467 BC, when Leophron became tyrant. However, in 461 BC the new rulers were removed by a popular revolt of the citizens of both Rhegium and Messana.

References

Ancient Rhegians
Ancient Messenians
Ancient Greek rulers
Ancient Olympic competitors
5th-century BC Greek people
476 BC deaths
Sicilian tyrants
Year of birth unknown
People from Reggio Calabria